Restigouche West is a provincial electoral district for the Legislative Assembly of New Brunswick, Canada.  It was used from 1974 through 2003, when it was split between the ridings of Restigouche-La-Vallée and Campbellton-Restigouche Centre. The riding was re-established in the 2013 electoral redistribution from parts of Dalhousie-Restigouche East, Restigouche-La-Vallée and Campbellton-Restigouche Centre and will be contested again beginning in the 2014 general election.

This riding was created in the 1973 redistribution when New Brunswick moved to single member districts from Bloc voting.  Prior to its creation, it had been part of the Restigouche County district which returned three members.  The riding, which was not changed in the 1994 redistribution, was made up of the part of Restigouche County that lies west of the Campbellton area. It included two incorporated municipalities: Saint-Quentin and Kedgwick.

It was merged with Madawaska-la-Vallée to form the new district of Restigouche-la-Vallée in the 2006 redistribution.

Following the 2013 electoral redistribution it was re-established, though its territory now stretches much further east into Restigouche County, and now includes all of Restigouche County except for the Campbellton-Dalhousie area and the town of Belledune.

In the 1987 election, when the New Brunswick Liberal Party won every seat, this was the closest contest.  The riding was won by a margin of 17 votes.

Members of the Legislative Assembly

Election results

2014–present

1974–2003

External links 
Website of the Legislative Assembly of New Brunswick

References

New Brunswick provincial electoral districts